Casimir Marie Gaudibert (4 March 1823 – 9 June 1901) was a French amateur astronomer and selenographer.

Gaudibert produced a map of the Moon in 1887. Under the direction of Camille Flammarion, Emile Bertaux subsequently produced a globe of the moon based on Gaudibert's lunar map.

The crater Gaudibert on the Moon is named after him.

Sources
Science Museum: Lunar globes

Gaudibert was born into a Roman Catholic family in central France He was converted to Protestantism through a conversation with an itinerant Spanish evangelist. He moved to Belgium where he was a preacher involved with L'Église missionnaire but was evicted from his pulpit because some of his teaching was considered as unacceptable. From then on he was a teacher in the Plymouth Brethren assemblies in Belgium. Information from his grandson whom I knew in Switzerland in the 1970s. T C F Stunt

External links
 Portrait of Casimir Marie Gaudibert  from the Lick Observatory Records Digital Archive, UC Santa Cruz Library's Digital Collections

1823 births
1901 deaths
19th-century French astronomers
Amateur astronomers
Selenographers